is a Japanese footballer currently playing as a midfielder for ReinMeer Aomori.

Career
Hirata began his professional career with Mito HollyHock after promotion to its top team ahead of the 2020 season.

Hirata was transferred to ReinMeer Aomori for the 2023 season, after spending the previous two seasons with the club as a loanee.

Career statistics

Club
.

Notes

References

External links

2001 births
Living people
Association football people from Gunma Prefecture
Japanese footballers
Association football midfielders
J2 League players
Japan Football League players
Mito HollyHock players
ReinMeer Aomori players